The 2007 NRL season was the one hundredth season of professional rugby league football club competition in Australia, and the tenth run by the National Rugby League. Sixteen teams contested the NRL's 2007 Telstra Premiership, and with the inclusion of a new team, the Gold Coast Titans, the competition was the largest run since the 1999 NRL season.

The Melbourne Storm were the minor premiers in 2007, six points clear of second-placed Manly Warringah Sea Eagles. The Storm eventually ran out 34–8 winners in the 2007 NRL Grand Final to claim the premiership. However, they were subsequently stripped of both their minor premiership and premiership titles on 22 April 2010, after they were found to be guilty of breaching the league's salary cap.

Season summary

Pre-season, 2006 premiers the Brisbane Broncos travelled to England to play the Super League champions in the 2007 World Club Challenge.

The 2007 NRL Season kicked off on Friday 16 March 2007 with eight games to be played in each round. The 2007 season saw the return of Monday Night Football, which helped the NRL to set new first round aggregate attendance record of 174,475. The opening round also saw two matches at Brisbane's Suncorp Stadium, one featured reigning champions Brisbane playing fellow Queensland side the Cowboys, while the second match introduced the newest club to be admitted to the competition, the Gold Coast Titans.

The North Queensland Cowboys' Jason Smith was the NRL's oldest player in 2007 at 35 years and 186 days.

Teams had fewer byes in 2007 than in the 2006 competition. With an odd number of teams contesting between 2002 and 2006, the draw meant that at least one team would have to have a bye each weekend. With the inclusion of the 16th team for the 2007 season, the National Rugby League had the option of reverting to the system used between 2000 and 2001 in which every team played in each round. However, this option was not chosen. In 2007, teams had just a single bye during the year, grouped in periods that will assist clubs around representative fixtures.

The top eight was not settled until the final round as the Brisbane Broncos and Wests Tigers were both on 24 points in 8th and 9th position respectively, with the Broncos ahead on points differential. Both teams lost their final regular season match and as a result of this, the South Sydney Rabbitohs made the top eight for the first time since 1989. The New Zealand Warriors secured a home final: the second match  in the history of the National Rugby League Finals played outside of Australia. The first was the Warriors' victory over the Canberra Raiders at Mt Smart Stadium while on their way to the 2002 Grand Final.

On the other end of the ladder, the Newcastle Knights and Penrith Panthers were both in contention for the Wooden Spoon – the traditional label for last place. The Knights performed well in their last match and denied the Wests Tigers a spot in the top eight, winning by two points, whereas the Panthers were defeated by the New Zealand Warriors, seeing them finish last.

2007 saw a total of over 3 million spectators attend regular season matches for only the second time in history.

Records set
The Brisbane Broncos recorded their biggest win in the club's history (65 points) with a 71–6 win over the Newcastle Knights at Suncorp Stadium in round 11. It's also the Newcastle Knights biggest ever loss.
New Zealand Warriors prop forward Steve Price ran 4,515 metres with the ball in 2007, more than any other forward in history.

Advertising
The National Rugby League kept use of the Hoodoo Gurus' "That's My Team" for a fifth consecutive season, with their advertising agency MJW Hakuhodo reworking the track "What's My Scene" and the "That's My Dream" slogan. With a design change for the Telstra Premiership logo (after months of off-season deliberation on whether Telstra would sponsor the code again), the commercial was a fast-paced action clip, with key players from all teams superimposed to appear as if they are playing in front the famous landmarks of their team's area. They are as follows:
 Brisbane Broncos – Darren Lockyer in front of the Story Bridge.
 Bulldogs – Andrew Ryan and Luke Patten in Sydney Olympic Park.
 Canberra Raiders – Phil Graham in front of Parliament House.
 Cronulla-Sutherland Sharks – on the steps of North Cronulla Beach.
 Gold Coast Titans – Luke Bailey taking a hit-up on Surfers Paradise' Beach.
 Manly Warringah Sea Eagles – on the Manly Beach Boulevarde.
 Melbourne Storm – running across Federation Square.
 Newcastle Knights – Danny Buderus scoring a try on the Newcastle Waterfront.
 North Queensland Cowboys – streets of Townsville.
 New Zealand Warriors – Steve Price in front of the city skyline of Auckland.
 Parramatta Eels – Eric Grothe, Jr. running down Church Street.
 Penrith Panthers – players on Mulgoa Road.
 St George Illawarra Dragons – Mark Gasnier running along the Seacliff Drive.
 South Sydney Rabbitohs – Roy Asotasi taking a hitup in the Sydney Harbour Tunnel.
 Sydney Roosters – players in front of the pavilion at Bondi Beach.
 Wests Tigers – Robbie Farah in Sydney Olympic Park.

As with previous seasons, all team captains featured prominently in the ads, holding aloft the premiership trophy as the advertisement closes, replicating the 2006 equivalent. Only weeks after it was put to air, Newcastle Knights captain Andrew Johns' career was ended by a neck injury.

Sponsorship
Telecommunications giant Telstra once again held the naming rights to the premiership season and for the seventh season the competition was known as the "Telstra Premiership". For the second time, however, a change was made to the Telstra Premiership Logo to align with the telco's own new logo.

Spirit producers Bundaberg Rum sponsored Monday night football – as Bundaberg Monday Night Football. Electronics wholesaler Harvey Norman continued their support of the State of Origin Series, The insurer AAMI sponsored the City vs Country Origin.

Teams
For the 2007 season the number of teams in the NRL had increasing from fifteen to sixteen with the re-inclusion of a Gold Coast, Queensland-based club for the first since 1998, now as the Gold Coast Titans. It was the first time the number of Premiership teams had changed since 2002 when the re-inclusion of the South Sydney Rabbitohs saw the number of teams increase from 14 to 15. The Titans were the NRL's first expansion team since the Melbourne Storm, who entered the League in 1998.

The sixteen teams participated in the competition over the regular season, making it the largest it had been since 1999 when there were seventeen. Of the sixteen clubs, ten were from New South Wales (nine from Sydney's metropolitan area), three from Queensland and one from each of Victoria, the ACT and New Zealand.

Just two foundation clubs from New South Wales Rugby League season 1908 played in this, the 100th season of the competition: the Sydney Roosters (formerly known as Eastern Suburbs) and the South Sydney Rabbitohs. Of these two clubs, only the Sydney Roosters played their 100th full season, as the South Sydney Rabbitohs were in recess during 2000 and 2001. Two foundation clubs, the Balmain Tigers and the Western Suburbs Magpies, had played in every year since 1908, but the two sides merged to create the Wests Tigers who competed every year since the merger in 2000.

Ladder

Finals series

To decide the grand finalists from the top eight finishing teams, the NRL adopts the McIntyre final eight system. The finals series was contested over a period of four weeks, culminating with the NRL Grand Final being held on Sunday 30 September 2007. For the first time, the week 2 and week 3 final matches were played in the cities of previous week winners rather than Sydney only.

Finals Chart

Grand final

Player statistics
The following statistics are as of the conclusion of Round 25.

Top 5 point scorers

Top 5 try scorers

Top 5 goal scorers

Dally M Awards

The Dally M Awards were introduced in 1980 by News Limited. The most prestigious of these awards is the Dally M Medal which is awarded to the Player Of The Year and many other awards. The other prestigious award is the Provans Summons Medal which is the season's best player as voted by the public. As well as honouring the player of the year the awards night also recognises the premier player in each position, the best coach, the best captain, representative player of the year and the most outstanding rookie of the season. The awards night and Player of the Year medal are named in honour of Australian former rugby league great Herbert Henry "Dally" Messenger. The top try-scorer and top point-scorer tallies are made at the end of the last round of the regular season and hence may be different from the overall top-scorers by the end of the finals.

Team of the Year

2007 Transfers

Players

Coaches

Footnotes

See also
National Rugby League
2007 Rugby League State of Origin series
2007 Australian football code crowds

External links
2007 NRL season at rugbyleagueproject.com
2007 NRL season at stats.rleague.com
2007 NRL season at abc.net.au